Thomas Wildemeersch (born 18 January 2000) is a Belgian professional footballer who plays as a midfielder for RAEC Mons.

Career
Wildemeersch joined R. Charleroi S.C. as a U7 player. He went through all the youth ranks of the club and made his official debut for the first team on 17 March 2019.

On 8 August 2019, Wildemeersch was loaned out to Francs Borains for the 2019–20 season. 

At the end of the 2019–20 season, he left Charleroi. He then signed with RAAL La Louvière on 20 July 2020.

References

2000 births
Living people
Belgian footballers
Association football defenders
R. Charleroi S.C. players
Francs Borains players
RAAL La Louvière players
Belgian Pro League players